Taktin Oey (born 1986) is an American composer from the Princeton Junction section of West Windsor Township, New Jersey, United States.

He graduated from West Windsor-Plainsboro High School North in 2004. He graduated from Harvard University in 2008. He has received a range of awards including the 1999 and 1996 ASCAP (American Society of Composers, Authors & Publishers) and First Prize for his Piano Quartet in the European Region's Young Composers’ Competition in 2000.

Oey's Symphony #1 was given its world premiere in 1997 by the Princeton Chamber Symphony when he was 10 years old and was performed in 1998 by the Orchestra London in Ontario.

References

Living people
1986 births
People from West Windsor, New Jersey
Harvard University alumni
21st-century American composers